"D'You Know What I Mean?" is a song by English rock band Oasis. Written by Noel Gallagher, it was released on 7 July 1997 as the first single from their third album, Be Here Now (1997).

The song reached number one on the UK Singles Chart, the third Oasis song to do so. The single also claimed the number-one position in Finland, Ireland, and Spain, and it reached the top five in Italy, New Zealand, Norway, and Sweden. In the United Kingdom, it sold 162,000 copies during its first day of release and 370,000 copies by the end of the week. It has sold 745,000 copies in the UK, achieving platinum status in the process, and it was the 12th-biggest-selling single of 1997 there. In October 2011, NME placed it at number 77 on its list "150 Best Tracks of the Past 15 Years".

An edited, remixed and remastered version of the song was released on 14 October 2016 entitled "D'You Know What I Mean? (NG's 2016 Rethink)". The reissue formed part of the wider rerelease of the Be Here Now album to celebrate its 20th anniversary. This new version was intended to be part of a remix of the entire album, but Noel Gallagher reportedly lost interest in the project and stopped after the first track.

B-sides
One of the B-sides, "Stay Young", has become a popular Oasis song, so much so that fans voted it onto the B-sides collection The Masterplan – one of only two B-sides from the Be Here Now period which made the album. The song was originally intended to be the "Digsy's Dinner" of Be Here Now (the lighthearted novelty track, such as "Digsy's Dinner" on Definitely Maybe and "She's Electric" on (What's the Story) Morning Glory?), until Noel set it aside in favour of "Magic Pie". Gallagher claims not to be particularly fond of the track. On 28 October 1998, "Stay Young" was released as a CD single in its own right by Epic Records Japan. One of the other B-sides is a cover of David Bowie's song "Heroes".

Interview
In a 1997 interview promoting Be Here Now, Noel Gallagher had the following to say about the first single: "I was going to make up some profound statement in the chorus but I couldn't come up with anything that fitted. Then I just thought 'All my people right here, right now, d'you know what I mean? Yeah, yeah.' Very vague, very ambiguous, that'll do. Look in the mirror and wink while you're singing it and it's quite saucy. And I fucking love that line, 'Coming in a mess, going out in style'. We were a bunch of scruffs from Manchester and we're going out in a Rolls-Royce." In another 1997 interview, this time on BBC, Noel Gallagher said: "I can't believe I wrote it, it's going to blow people away."

"The morse code in the background was inspired by Strawberry Fields Forever. We got hold of a code book and tried to tap out 'Bugger All' to follow that line 'Don't look back cos you know what you might see'. But if anyone can tell me what we really said, please let me know. Profound lagerisms..."

In an interview with the BBC for their documentary Seven Ages of Rock, Gallagher said of the song, "It's eight and a half minutes, the first single, the drums haven't fuckin' come in for two minutes—it's all feedback!" He also said that he expected someone to ask them to edit the introduction to the song down, but such was their status in Britain, nobody did. They even performed the song on Top of the Pops, omitting most of the lengthy introduction.

The lyrics reference two Beatles songs—"The Fool on the Hill" and "I Feel Fine"—as well as the Bob Dylan albums Blood on the Tracks and Bringing It All Back Home, and the Dylan documentary Dont Look Back. The line "I ain't good looking but I'm someone's child" is adapted from a line in Blind Willie McTell's "Statesboro Blues".

Packaging
The single cover photograph, by Michael Spencer Jones and directed by Brian Cannon of Microdot, was taken in front of the 'Blind Steps', a staircase in Wigan so called because they run past the Blind Workshop, which can be seen to the left of the shot. The steps can still be found on Darlington Street. The shoot was shrouded in secrecy to protect mass media coverage, but newspaper The Wigan Evening Post got exclusive rights to cover the event and subsequently sold the photos to the Daily Mirror. At a lunchtime break, Liam Gallagher and sleeve designer Brian Cannon enjoyed a pint of beer in the nearby Crispin Arms pub by Birkett Bank.

Critical reception
British magazine Music Week rated "D'You Know What I Mean?" five out of five, picking it as Single of the Week. The added, "Typically anthemic and catchy, but with a fuller, more layered production than they've previously offered. A number one, possibly the biggest of the year."

Music video
The accompanying music video for "D'You Know What I Mean?", directed by Dom and Nic, is set in an apparently post-apocalyptic world and shows the band playing as a growing number of military helicopters fly overhead. Several of the helicopters land while a crowd gathers to watch the band play and throw coloured smoke grenades. At the end, the band members board one of the helicopters and fly away.

The video story's setting is unclear. It was filmed on location at Beckton Gas Works in London, which has also been used as a filming location by The Smiths and Stanley Kubrick among others. The phrases "Do you know what I mean?" and "Be here now" can be seen painted in Czech on one of the surrounding buildings. Liam Gallagher wears a snorkel parka and sports a unique pair of tailor-made sunglasses.

The helicopters used were British Army Westland Lynx AH.7s. One is an AH.7(DAS) variant, notable for the distinctive ALQ-144 (disco ball) infra-red jammer under the tail. The other is a straight AH.7, albeit with a TOW antitank missile sight mounted over the left-hand front seat. Although only two helicopters were used, post-production techniques such as split screen editing, and clever camera angling produced the numerous helicopters seen in the video.

The band was later accused of hypocrisy for hiring the helicopters for the video. In 2002, the band had forced the British Army to pull a recruiting video that used "Morning Glory" as background music, stating their vehement opposition to war and the military.

Track listings
All songs were written by Noel Gallagher except where noted.

 UK CD single 
 "D'You Know What I Mean?"
 "Stay Young"
 "Angel Child" (demo)
 "Heroes" (David Bowie, Brian Eno)

 UK 7-inch and cassette single 
 "D'You Know What I Mean?"
 "Stay Young"

 UK 12-inch sleeve 
A1. "D'You Know What I Mean?"
B1. "Stay Young"
B2. "Angel Child" (demo)

 US promo CD 
 "D'You Know What I Mean?" (radio edit) – 6:06
 "D'You Know What I Mean?" (album version) – 7:22

Personnel
Oasis
 Liam Gallagher – lead vocals, tambourine
 Noel Gallagher – lead guitar, acoustic guitar, backing vocals, string arrangements
 Paul "Bonehead" Arthurs – rhythm guitar
 Paul "Guigsy" McGuigan – bass
 Alan White – drums

Additional musicians
 Mark Coyle – backwards guitar

Charts and certifications

Weekly charts

Year-end charts

Certifications

Release history

References

External links
 D'You Know What I Mean? at official band site 
 D'You Know What I Mean – Oasis at AllMusic

1997 singles
1997 songs
Creation Records singles
Epic Records singles
Irish Singles Chart number-one singles
Number-one singles in Finland
Number-one singles in Scotland
Number-one singles in Spain
Oasis (band) songs
Song recordings produced by Noel Gallagher
Songs written by Noel Gallagher
UK Singles Chart number-one singles